Fala Sério, Mãe! is a 2017 Brazilian comedy film, directed by Pedro Vasconcelos, starring Ingrid Guimarães, Larissa Manoela, Marcelo Laham and João Guilherme Ávila.

Plot
Ângela Cristina (Ingrid Guimarães), mother of teenager Maria de Lourdes (Larissa Manoela), has to deal with the difficulties and delights of guiding her daughter during one of the most complicated stages of life.

Cast 

 Ingrid Guimarães as Ângela Cristina Siqueira Paz
 Larissa Manoela as Maria de Lourdes Siqueira Paz (Malu)
 Vitória Magalhães as	Maria de Lourdes (10 years old)
 Duda Batista	as Maria de Lourdes (5 years old)
 Marcelo Laham as Armando Paz
 João Guilherme Ávila as Nando
 Kaik Brum as Mário Márcio Siqueira Paz
 Raphael Tomé	as Mário Márcio Siqueira Paz (4 years old)
 Carolina Dumani as Malena Siqueira Paz
 Giovanna Rispoli as Alice
 Cristina Pereira as Fátima Paz
 Luisa Bastos as Luna
 Sofia Leão as Sofia
 Catherine Beranger as	Aline
 Thalita Rebouças as Store owner
 Júlio Calasso as Seu Edgar
 Fábio Júnior as himself
 Paulo Gustavo as himself

Reception

After three weeks, Fala Sério, Mãe! reached the mark of 2 million spectators. In total the film surpassed the mark of 3 million spectators, being a success in box office.

References

External links
 

2010s Portuguese-language films
Brazilian comedy films
2017 comedy films
Films set in Rio de Janeiro (city)